Joseph Shephard (1822 – 25 October 1898) was a 19th-century Member of Parliament from Nelson, New Zealand.

Biography
Shephard arrived in Nelson in 1861 on the Donna Lita. For several years, he was an editor for the Nelson newspaper Colonist.

He unsuccessfully contested the Waimea electorate in the 1867 by-election, and the City of Nelson electorate in the 1868 by-election.

At the nomination meeting on 5 September 1879, Shephard, Albert Pitt, Oswald Curtis and Acton Adams were proposed, the latter three without their knowledge or consent, presumably by opponents of George Grey who had the support of Shephard. With Pitt, Curtis and Adams all formally withdrawing from the contest, the returning officer declared Shephard elected unopposed.

He was appointed to the Legislative Council in 1885, where he served until he died in 1898.

References

1822 births
1898 deaths
Members of the New Zealand House of Representatives
Members of the New Zealand Legislative Council
Unsuccessful candidates in the 1875–1876 New Zealand general election
New Zealand MPs for South Island electorates
19th-century New Zealand politicians